CHA Consulting, Inc. (previously known as Clough, Harbour & Associates LLP) is an international engineering consulting and construction management firm headquartered in Albany, New York. The firm was founded in 1952 by John Clarkeson, P.E., in Boston, Massachusetts and focused on civil design work. The firm was subsequently purchased by Ronald Clough and renamed Clough & Associates.  Ronald Clough then partnered with Bill Harbour and the firm was renamed Clough, Harbour & Associates, LLP.    

Some of the firm’s first notable projects were its work on Boston’s “Inner Belt” highway and the Interstate Highways throughout the Northeast.

CHA has grown substantially since then and now has a large presence in several different engineering fields, including power supply and distribution, communications infrastructure, structural, electrical, mechanical, environmental, geotechnical, civil, aviation, rail, and traffic/transportation engineering, as well as landscape architecture, land use planning, surveying, sports and recreation, wetland delineation, construction engineering and technology services.

According to a recent listing by Engineering News-Record (ENR), a publication which ranks design firms based on information about their revenue, CHA is the 61st largest engineering design firm in the United States.

CHA Consulting and its subsidiary companies were sold in 2018 to First Reserve, a private equity firm that focuses on the acquisition of internationally-based energy companies.

Notable projects
In the Albany, NY area, CHA has engineered some large scale projects, including the Times Union Center, the Joseph L. Bruno Stadium, the Albany Pedestrian Walkway, the expansive Colonie Town Park, and the Albany Capital Center.

Rensselear Station and Albany Track Enhancements 
CHA Consulting designed the $50 million project including renovations and improvements to Albany's Rensselear Station, which included the addition of a fourth track. Furthermore, improvements to the train tracks between Albany, NY and Schenectady, NY are currently ongoing, a project which received the 2018 ACEC Gold Award for Excellence in Engineering.

References

Engineering companies of the United States
Companies based in Albany, New York
History of Boston